Heidi Gan (born 8 October 1988)  is a Malaysian distance swimmer. At the 2012 Summer Olympics, she competed in the Women's marathon 10 kilometre, finishing in 16th place.  In the same event, she finished in 21st place at the 2016 Summer Olympics.

References

1988 births
Living people
Malaysian female long-distance swimmers
Olympic swimmers of Malaysia
Swimmers at the 2012 Summer Olympics
Swimmers at the 2016 Summer Olympics
Malaysian people of Chinese descent
Southeast Asian Games medalists in swimming
Southeast Asian Games gold medalists for Malaysia
Southeast Asian Games silver medalists for Malaysia
Southeast Asian Games bronze medalists for Malaysia
Competitors at the 2017 Southeast Asian Games
21st-century Malaysian women